Widmanstätten patterns, also known as Thomson structures, are figures of long nickel–iron crystals, found in the octahedrite iron meteorites and some pallasites. They consist of a fine interleaving of kamacite and taenite bands or ribbons called lamellae. Commonly, in gaps between the lamellae, a fine-grained mixture of kamacite and taenite called plessite can be found. Widmanstätten patterns describe features in modern steels, titanium, and zirconium alloys.

Discovery

In 1808, these figures were observed by Count Alois von Beckh Widmanstätten, the director of the Imperial Porcelain works in Vienna. While flame heating iron meteorites, Widmanstätten noticed color and luster zone differentiation as the various iron alloys oxidized at different rates. He did not publish his findings, claiming them only via oral communication with his colleagues. The discovery was acknowledged by Carl von Schreibers, director of the Vienna Mineral and Zoology Cabinet, who named the structure after Widmanstätten.
However, it is now believed that the discovery of the metal crystal pattern should be assigned to the English mineralogist William (Guglielmo) Thomson, as he published the same findings four years earlier.

Working in Naples in 1804, Thomson treated a Krasnojarsk meteorite with nitric acid to remove the dull patina caused by oxidation. Shortly after the acid made contact with the metal, strange figures appeared on the surface, which he detailed as described above. Civil wars and political instability in southern Italy made it difficult for Thomson to maintain contact with his colleagues in England. This was demonstrated in his loss of important correspondence when its carrier was murdered. As a result, in 1804, his findings were only published in French in the Bibliothèque Britannique.  At the beginning of 1806, Napoleon invaded the Kingdom of Naples and Thomson was forced to flee to Sicily and in November of that year, he died in Palermo at the age of 46. In 1808, Thomson's work was again published posthumously in Italian (translated from the original English manuscript) in Atti dell'Accademia Delle Scienze di Siena. The Napoleonic wars obstructed Thomson's contacts with the scientific community and his travels across Europe, in addition to his early death, obscured his contributions for many years.

Name
The most common names for these figures are Widmanstätten pattern and Widmanstätten structure, however, there are some spelling variations:
 Widmanstetter (proposed by Frederick C. Leonard)
 Widmannstätten (used for example for the Widmannstätten lunar crater)
 Widmanstatten (Anglicized)

Due to the discover priority of G. Thomson, several authors suggested to call these figures Thomson structure or Thomson-Widmanstätten structure.

Lamellae formation mechanism

Iron and nickel form homogeneous alloys at temperatures below the melting point; these alloys are taenite. At temperatures below 900 to 600 °C (depending on the Ni content), two alloys with different nickel content are stable: kamacite with lower Ni-content (5 to 15% Ni) and taenite with high Ni (up to 50%). Octahedrite meteorites have a nickel content intermediate between the norm for kamacite and taenite; this leads under slow cooling conditions to the precipitation of kamacite and growth of kamacite plates along certain crystallographic planes in the taenite crystal lattice.

The formation of Ni-poor kamacite proceeds by diffusion of Ni in the solid alloy at temperatures between 700 and 450 °C, and can only take place during very slow cooling, about 100 to 10,000 °C/Myr, with total cooling times of 10 Myr or less. This explains why this structure cannot be reproduced in the laboratory.

The crystalline patterns become visible when the meteorites are cut, polished, and acid-etched, because taenite is more resistant to the acid.

The dimension of kamacite lamellae ranges from coarsest to finest (upon their size) as the nickel content increases. This classification is called structural classification.

Usage
Since nickel-iron crystals grow to lengths of some centimeters only when the solid metal cools down at an exceptionally slow rate (over several million years), the presence of these patterns is strongly suggestive of extraterrestrial origin of the material, and can be used to indicate if a piece of iron may come from a meteorite.

Preparation

The methods used to reveal the Widmanstätten pattern on iron meteorites vary. Most commonly, the slice is ground and polished, cleaned, etched with a chemical such as nitric acid or ferric chloride, washed, and dried.

Shape and orientation

Cutting the meteorite along different planes affects the shape and direction of Widmanstätten figures because kamacite lamellae in octahedrites are precisely arranged. Octahedrites derive their name from the crystal structure paralleling an octahedron. Opposite faces are parallel so, although an octahedron has 8 faces, there are only 4 sets of kamacite plates. Iron and nickel-iron form crystals with an external octahedral structure only very rarely, but these orientations are still plainly detectable crystallographically without the external habit. Cutting an octahedrite meteorite along different planes (or any other material with octahedral symmetry, which is a sub-class of cubic symmetry) will result in one of these cases:
 perpendicular cut to one of the three (cubic) axes: two sets of bands at right angles each other
 parallel cut to one of the octahedron faces (cutting all 3 cubic axes at the same distance from the crystallographic center) : three sets of bands running at 60° angles each other
 any other angle: four sets of bands with different angles of intersection

Structures in non-meteoritic materials
The term  is also used on non-meteoritic material to indicate a structure with a geometrical pattern resulting from the formation of a new phase along certain crystallographic planes of the parent phase, such as the basketweave structure in some zirconium alloys. The Widmanstätten structures form due to the growth of new phases within the grain boundaries of the parent metals, generally increasing the hardness and brittleness of the metal. The structures form due to the precipitation of a single crystal phase into two separate phases. In this way, the Widmanstätten transformation differs from other transformations, such as a martensite or ferrite transformation. The structures form at very precise angles, which may vary depending on the arrangement of the crystal lattices. These are usually very small structures that must be viewed through a microscope because a very long cooling rate is generally needed to produce structures visible to the naked eye. However, they usually have a great and often an undesirable effect on the properties of the alloy.

Widmanstätten structures tend to form within a certain temperature range, growing larger over time. These structures form as a needle or plate-like growths of cementite within the crystal boundaries of the martensite. This increases the brittleness of the steel in a way that can only be relieved by recrystallizing. Widmanstätten structures made from ferrite sometimes occur in carbon steel, if the carbon content is below but near the eutectoid composition (~ 0.8% carbon). This occurs as long needles of ferrite within the pearlite.

Widmanstätten structures form in many other metals as well. They will form in brass, especially if the alloy has a very high zinc content, becoming needles of zinc in the copper matrix. Telluric iron, which is an iron-nickel alloy very similar to meteorites, also displays very coarse Widmanstätten structures. Telluric iron is metallic iron, rather than an ore (in which iron is usually found), and it originated from the Earth rather than from space. Telluric iron is an extremely rare metal, found only in a few places in the world. Like meteorites, the very coarse Widmanstätten structures most likely develop through very slow cooling, except that the cooling occurred in the Earth's mantle and crust rather than in the vacuum and microgravity of space. Such patterns have also been seen in mulberry, a ternary uranium alloy, after aging at or below  for periods of minutes to hours produces a monoclinic ɑ phase.

However, the appearance, the composition, and the formation process of these terrestrial Widmanstätten structures are different from the characteristic structure of iron meteorites.

When an iron meteorite is forged into a tool or weapon, the Widmanstätten patterns remain but become stretched and distorted. The patterns usually cannot be fully eliminated by blacksmithing, even through extensive working. When a knife or tool is forged from meteoric iron and then polished, the patterns appear on the surface of the metal, albeit distorted, but they tend to retain some of the original octahedral shapes and the appearance of thin lamellae crisscrossing each other. Pattern-welded steels such as Damascus steel also bear patterns, but they are easily discernible from any Widmanstätten pattern.

See also
 Acicular ferrite
 Count Alois von Beckh Widmanstätten
 Glossary of meteoritics
 Meteorite

References

External links

Widmannstätten figures on the Gibeon Iron-Meteorite

Meteorite mineralogy and petrology
Patterns
Ferrous alloys
Nickel alloys